The 1974–75 season was Colchester United's 33rd season in their history and their first season back in the third tier of English football for six years, the Third Division. Alongside competing in the Third Division, the club also participated in the FA Cup and the League Cup.

Jim Smith consolidated Colchester's position back in the third tier by leading them to an eleventh position finish to the season. They experienced a successful cup run in the League Cup, eventually falling to Second Division Aston Villa in the quarter-final stage. However, they were knocked out of the FA Cup in the second round by non-League outfit Leatherhead.

Season overview
Ahead of the new season, Colchester's board warned that a break-even gate of 9,200 was required and that players would be sold if attendances didn't reach an average of 7,500. However, manager Jim Smith returned to former club Boston United to sign Bobby Svarc's old strike partner John Froggatt for £6,000. The acquisition was fruitful, with Svarc finding the back of the net 24 times in the league and 25 times in total, with Froggatt registering 18 with 16 in the league.

Having reached the quarter-final of the FA Cup four seasons prior, the U's emulated that achievement in the League Cup. After beating Oxford United and Southend United, they hosted First Division Carlisle United, beating the Cumbrians 2–0 to earn a home tie with Southampton. A 0–0 draw at Layer Road led to a 1–0 replay win at The Dell, courtesy of a Barry Dominey goal. This set up a quarter-final tie with Second Division Aston Villa. Villa were just too strong for United, winning 2–1 before a Layer Road crowd of 11,812.

Colchester's success in the League Cup was not replicated in the FA Cup as they were knocked out by non-League outfit Leatherhead in the second round. In the league, a strong start to the season was followed up by a weaker second half to the campaign as the U's fell from fifth to eleventh where they ended the season.

Crowds fell a long way short of the target expected by the board, with a league average of 4,941 attending during the season.

Players

Transfers

In

 Total spending:  ~ £6,000

Out

 Total incoming:  ~ £4,000

Loans in

Loans out

Match details

Third Division

Results round by round

League table

Matches

League Cup

FA Cup

Squad statistics

Appearances and goals

|-
!colspan="14"|Players who appeared for Colchester who left during the season

|}

Goalscorers

Disciplinary record

Clean sheets
Number of games goalkeepers kept a clean sheet.

Player debuts
Players making their first-team Colchester United debut in a fully competitive match.

See also
List of Colchester United F.C. seasons

References

General
Books

Websites

Specific

1974-75
English football clubs 1974–75 season